Ahmed Khalil (born 21 December 1994) is a Tunisian international footballer who plays for Club Africain as a midfielder.

Club career
Khalil has played for JS Kairouan and Club Africain.

International career
He made his international debut in 2016, and was named in the squad for the 2017 Africa Cup of Nations, and the 2018 FIFA World Cup.

Career statistics

International

References

External links

1994 births
Living people
Tunisian footballers
Tunisia international footballers
JS Kairouan players
Club Africain players
Tunisian Ligue Professionnelle 1 players
Association football midfielders
2017 Africa Cup of Nations players
2018 FIFA World Cup players